Angela Zhang (born 19 January 1982), also known as Angela Chang, is a Taiwanese singer and actress. Zhang has released ten studio albums as of 2020.

She debuted and rose to fame with the Taiwanese television dramas My MVP Valentine (2002) and At Dolphin Bay (2003), although since 2004, when her debut album Over the Rainbow met with instant success, she has focused on her singing career. Aurora (2004) and Pandora (2006) sold millions in Asia, while another TV series that she starred in, Romantic Princess (2007), also became an international hit.

In 2008–09, she withdrew from the public eye for nearly a year and a half when her mother accused her of being unfilial and unsupportive. Zhang, in turn, claimed that her mother had squandered more than NT$100 million of her income. The media's relentless coverage of her family problems, exacerbated by Zhang's falling-out with her employer Linfair Records, accusing her of not doing enough to protect her which significantly derailed her career for many years. Zhang later returned after a few year hiatus when she compete in Hunan's reality singing competition Singer 2018, the seventh season of I Am a Singer where she served as a host and contestant. Having moved her career to mainland China, her 2019 album ?, under a new label, was the 56th best-selling album in China in 2019.

Zhang's maternal grandfather was an ethnic Uyghur, with the rest of her family Hakka. She grew up in Taiwan and Canada.

Early years 
Zhang was born into an ethnic Hakka family from Zhongli, Taoyuan, Taiwan. At the age of ten, Zhang moved to Singapore to study. After a few months, she returned to Taiwan because she "was not able to adapt (to life) there". Her family later migrated to Vancouver, where she attended Sir Winston Churchill Secondary School.

Personal life 
Zhang's popularity rose as she played a leading role in the Taiwanese television drama My MVP Valentine with Taiwanese boy band 5566, followed by a leading role in another Taiwanese television drama At Dolphin Bay with Taiwanese actor Wallace Huo, in which she also sang the ending theme song (Yi Shi De Mei Hao) and English song (Journey). She has been nominated twice for Best Actress at Golden Bell Awards. She also has been nominated twice for Best Mandarin Female Singer at Golden Melody Awards. In 2010, Zhang became a spokesperson of Shanghai Expo 2010 and sang the theme song "The Window of the City".

Zhang performed at the first Formula 1 Festival in Shanghai.

The melody to her song titled Ying Xing De Chi Pang was used in 2007 on Chinese TV in an advertisement for Wrigley Gum.

In 2008 Zhang was diagnosed with mitral valve prolapse.

Discography

Studio albums

Collaborations

Filmography

Feature films

Television

Awards

References

External links 

1982 births
Living people
21st-century Taiwanese actresses
21st-century Taiwanese singers
21st-century Taiwanese women singers
Canadian people of Chinese descent
Canadian people of Uyghur descent
English-language singers from Taiwan
Hakka musicians
Naturalized citizens of Canada
Taiwanese emigrants to Canada
Taiwanese film actresses
Taiwanese Mandopop singers
Taiwanese people of Hakka descent
Taiwanese people of Uyghur descent
Taiwanese television actresses